The Singapore Baptist Convention was established on 28 December 1974. It is affiliated to the Baptist World Alliance and the Asia Pacific Baptist Federation.

As of July 2021, the Singapore Baptist Convention has 37 member Churches of 9,200 Baptists. The Singapore Baptist Convention consists of 3 Agencies, namely, the Convention Office, the Baptist Theological Seminary, and the Baptist Golden Age Home. The Convention is led by the Executive Director, Rev Dr Bobby Lee Oon Chai, who holds a M.Div. from the Singapore Bible College, and a D.Min. from Union University, Tennessee.
Abundant Life Baptist Church
Acts Baptist Church
Agape Baptist Church
Bauhinia Baptist Church
Calvary Baptist Church
Changi Baptist Church
Cherith Baptist Church
Community of Praise Baptist Church
Cornerstone Evangelical Baptist Church
Coronation Baptist Church
Eternal Life Baptist Church
Evangel Baptist Church
Fifth Wall Community
Good News Baptist Church
Gospel Baptist Church
Grace Baptist Church
Grace Bible Fellowship
His Family Centre
Hope Baptist Church
Hosanna Baptist Church
International Baptist Church
International Japanese Church of Singapore
Judson Baptist Church
Karen Baptist Church
Kachin Baptist Church
Kay Poh Road Baptist Church
Leng Kwang Baptist Church
Neighbourhood Baptist Church
New Life Baptist Church
Queenstown Baptist Church
Redeemer Baptist Church
Sembawang Baptist Church
Shalom Baptist Chapel
Shelter Baptist Church
The Singapore Baptist Church
The Singapore Thomson Road Baptist Church

References

External links
 Singapore Baptist Convention - Official Website

Protestantism in Singapore
Christian organizations established in 1974
Baptist denominations established in the 20th century